"Force" is a song by Japanese rock unit Superfly. It is a song from the album of the same name, serving as its title track. It is being released as a re-cut single on October 31, 2012. The song, on its own, is used as the theme song for the TV Asahi drama Doctor X, and as a radio single reached 46 on the Billboard Japan Hot 100.

Track listing

References

External links
"Force" on Superfly-web.com

2012 singles
2012 songs
Japanese-language songs
Superfly (band) songs
Warner Music Japan singles